A Route Army (路軍/路军), was a type of military organization during the first Republic of China, and usually exercised command over two or more corps or a large number of divisions or independent brigades. It was a common formation in China prior to the Second Sino-Japanese War but was discarded as a formation type by the National Revolutionary Army after 1938 (other than the 8th Route Army), in favor of the Group Army.

Some of the more famous of the Route Armies were:

 8th Route Army: Chinese Communist force in North China.
 19th Route Army: Defending Shanghai in 1932 during the January 28 Incident.

References 
 

Military units and formations of China
National Revolutionary Army